Aghcheh Qeshlaq (also Romanized as Āghcheh Qeshlāq; also known as Āqcheh Qeshlāq and Īncheh Qeshlāq) is a village in Qarah Su Rural District, in the Central District of Khoy County, West Azerbaijan Province, Iran. At the 2006 census, its population was 408, in 71 families.

References 

Populated places in Khoy County